Helge Røstad (29 December 1923 – 23 October 1994) was a Norwegian judge.

He was born in Kristiansand. He worked in the Norwegian Prosecuting Authority from 1968, as deputy under-secretary of State in the Ministry of Justice and the Police from 1970, and as a Supreme Court Justice from 1976 to 1993. In 1985 he received an honorary doctorate from the Faculty of 
Law at Uppsala University, Sweden.

References

1923 births
1994 deaths
People from Kristiansand
Norwegian civil servants
Supreme Court of Norway justices